Harry Vaughan may refer to:
 Farmer Vaughn (Harry Francis Vaughn, 1864–1914), baseball player
 Harry Vaughan (American football) (1883–1951), head coach of the Ohio State Buckeyes American football team
 Harry H. Vaughan (1893–1981), general and White House military aide during the Truman administration
 W. Harry Vaughan (1900–?), founder of the Georgia Tech Research Institute
 Harry Vaughan (footballer), English footballer